Run Raja Run is a 2014 Indian Telugu-language romantic comedy thriller film directed by debutant Sujeeth and produced by Uppalapati Pramod and V. Vamsi Krishna Reddy on UV Creations banner. The film stars Sharwanand, Seerat Kapoor, and Adivi Sesh, while Sampath Raj and Jayaprakash play important roles. The film released worldwide on 1 August 2014 to positive reviews from critics and became a box office success. The film was also dubbed and released in Tamil under the same title.

Plot
Raja Harishchandra Prasad is the son of a vegetable vendor named Prakash, who is constantly keep breaking up with girlfriends because of his extreme honesty. He meets Priya and they both fall in love. Meanwhile, there are kidnappings of ministers in the city and the person who solved the mystery years ago, commissioner Dileep Kumar has an officer under him, Nayeem Basha, who is an intelligent officer but is not appreciated for it. Raja learns that Priya is Dileep's daughter and that she is about to marry Minister Govindharaju's son Mukundham.

Raja talks with Dileep, who reveals that he wants to get Priya married to Mukundham and tricks Raja into kidnapping one of the big shots in city, but Raja instead kidnaps Priya, who tells him that she never loved him and only pretended so that she could go for higher studies in US. Though heartbroken, Raja takes her to her friend's house. Dileep tries to find her but is not successful. Priya starts falling for Raja, who calls Dileep and demands  as ransom. After comparing Priya's and other kidnappings, Nayeem finds out that the kidnapper is Raja and informs Dileep and that he tricked Dileep. Priya learns about the ransom. When she is questioning him, her father comes and arrests Raja. Dileep is happy that the kidnapper is caught, but Mukundham is later kidnapped. When Dileep heads to the police station, Raja is not there.

Priya finds out from her mother that Prakash and Dileep were good friends, and that Prakash considered Karim, a sincere cop, as his own family. Prakash found that the kidnappings were planned by Govindaraju, where he heads to arrest Govindaraju, but Dileep reveals that it was his plan. Govindaraju kills Karim. Enraged, Prakash shoots Govindaraju, (where the bullet hits his throat and remains there) and is framed for the kidnapping and imprisoned. Meanwhile, Dileep learns that Nayeem and Raja were in cahoots. Nayeem takes  from Raju. Prakash reveals to Dileep that Nayeem is Karim's son. Raja then sends a video to the media in which Dileep has admitted to be the kidnapper. Dileep is arrested as Govindaraju dies of his gunshot wound. Finally, Priya and Raja reunite.

Cast 

Sharwanand as Raja Harishchandra Prasad
Seerat Kapoor as Priya
Adivi Sesh as Nayeem Basha
Sampath Raj as Police Commissioner Dileep Kumar
Jayaprakash as Prakash (Ex Police Commissioner)
Kota Srinivasa Rao as Minister Govindharaju
Vennela Kishore as Mukundham (Raju's son)
Ali as Doctor
Vidyullekha Raman as Bujjima
Ajay Ghosh as Raju's assistant
Chatrapathi Sekhar as Md. Khalid Basha
Sujeeth as himself

Production 
Sharwanand was approached by short film maker Sujeeth to play the male protagonist in the film and the former accepted the offer after expressing few doubts. He was forced by the makers to change his look for the film and for giving him a new look, Bhaskar designed the costumes and hair stylist Hakim Aalim was selected for the hair styling and basic look. He did not take any remuneration for the film as the producers were his friends. Seerat Kapoor was selected after conducting a photo shoot followed by a screen test after she gave her audition at Hyderabad which marked her debut in Telugu cinema. Uppalapati Pramod and Vamsi Krishna announced this film with Adivi Sesh in an important role apart from the protagonists in mid December 2013.

Further details about the project were unveiled on 10 February 2014 and the film was titled Run Raja Run after one of the short films directed by Sujeeth and the producers confirmed that the film is a bilingual. R. Madhi was declared as the cinematographer and M. Ghibran was selected as the music director marking his Telugu debut. On 10 February 2014 the press release confirmed that Adivi Sesh, Sampath Raj, Jayaprakash, Vennela Kishore, Ali, Kota Srinivasa Rao, Vidyullekha Raman and Ajay Ghosh are part of the principal cast. By mid-February 2014, about 50% of the film's shoot was complete and the shooting was undergoing at Ramoji Film City in Hyderabad before shifting to Goa for a month-long schedule.

Reception 
The film received positive reviews from critics. Deccan Chronicle wrote "Director Sujeeth's story is not unique, but his screenplay makes it interesting. A pat to the young director's back for coming up with a breezy entertainer. There are a few minus points too as the beginning of the film is a bit boring. The film, however, slowly picks up." Sify gave a review stating "Overall Run Raja Run is a fun caper, with an impressive second half. For Sharwanand this film is a perfect comeback. The pluses in this film are the lead hero's performance and the twists and turns. Run Raja Run promises good entertainment this monsoon." IndiaGlitz gave a review stating "The director manages to narrate a story with so many non-obvious ideas, in a simpler way.  The style of screenplay has snatches of the narration we saw in 'Kick' but with a difference. Sujeeth's writing and execution is creative.  With no action and only mind games and slick and snazzy presentation, the film will be lapped up by the class movie-loving audience" and rated the film 3.25/5.

On the other hand, The Hindu wrote "What seem to be attempts at humour just end up being crass and forced. However, things do pick up towards the climax and all the pointless sequences seem to fall into place. It is with this twist that the film finally becomes interesting." The Times of India wrote "Sujeeth gets a lot of things right in his debut film; however, it still is a lost opportunity. The emphasis on style takes over the sharp writing that's quite visible in the first act. For all you know, Run Raja Run could have been a truly unique and quirky film in a long time. Alas, it ends up as a light-hearted entertainer which begins to take itself too seriously after a point and loses its edginess in the process" and rated the film 3/5.

Soundtrack 

Ghibran composed the music and background score for this film which marked his debut in Telugu. He was approached by Sujeeth, Uppalapati Pramod and R. Madhi to compose the film's music at Chennai when Pramod was impressed with his work in Naiyaandi and Sujeeth was impressed with his work in Vaagai Sooda Vaa. Ghibran, who wanted to do a Telugu film then, accepted their proposal. There were 5 songs in the film's soundtrack in which one was a fast beat song, one was a melody, one was a pub song and the other two were of different genres. Ramajogayya Sastry wrote three songs while Sri Mani wrote the other two songs. The film's soundtrack was released on 15 June 2014 by hosting a promotional event at GRIET in Hyderabad and the album was marketed by Junglee Music.

The film's soundtrack received positive reviews from critics. The Times of India wrote "All in all, the album has peculiar compositions and Ghibran delivers promising tracks with refreshing feel mainly targeted at youth" and rated the soundtrack 3/5. IndiaGlitz wrote "'Run Raja Run's music director seems to have begun with experimenting a bit.  Maybe he was wanted that way by his director. The album has got a quirky side to it. A song crooned by Chinmayi, that comes in the end, is the best in two senses: the music as well as its ability to undo the offbeat feel of the whole album. Watch out the presentation on the screen as much as the songs."

Awards

South Indian International Movie Awards – winner
 Best Debut Director (Telugu) – Sujeeth

Filmfare Awards South – nominations
 Best Film 
 Best Director – Sujeeth
 Best Actor – Sharwanand
 Best Music Director – Ghibran

Nandi Awards
Best Female Comedian - Vidyullekha Raman

References

External links 
 

2014 films
2014 romantic comedy films
2010s Telugu-language films
2014 masala films
Films shot at Ramoji Film City
Films shot in Goa
Indian comedy thriller films
Indian romantic comedy films
Films about kidnapping in India
Indian films about revenge
2010s comedy thriller films
UV Creations films